Mangifera casturi (also called Kalimantan mango or kasturi) is a species of plant in the family Anacardiaceae.

It was endemic to the Kalimantan region of Borneo, but is now considered extinct in the wild.

References

External links
 Article about Mangifera casturi

casturi
Extinct flora of Asia
Endemic flora of Borneo
Flora of Kalimantan
Trees of Borneo
Taxonomy articles created by Polbot
Taxa named by André Joseph Guillaume Henri Kostermans